Thomas Wesley Jackson (6 June 1859 – 26 February 1934) was a Canadian politician. He served on the 1st Council of the Northwest Territories for Qu'Appelle from 1884 to 1886.

Jackson was born at Downsview, Canada West, of Irish ancestry. He worked as a lawyer for a time at Chatham, Ontario, before moving to the Qu'Appelle Valley in 1880. At Qu'Appelle he would farm and get involved with the railway, eventually raising to the position of President of the Qu'Appelle and Wood Mountain Railway. He was also a justice of the peace.

He was elected in 1883 to the Council of the North West Territories, and resigned his seat in September 1886, owing to his activities as president of the railway. He later resided at Indian Head, Saskatchewan. He died at Vancouver, British Columbia in 1934.

Electoral results

1884 election

1885 election

References

1859 births
1934 deaths
Members of the Legislative Assembly of the Northwest Territories
Canadian people of Irish descent